Baffled and Beat is the debut album from the Oxford, UK alternative rock band Little Fish. After several delays, having been initially set to be released in February 2010, it was finally released on 16 August 2010.

Three tracks from the album; "Am I Crazy", "Darling Dear", and "Bang Bang", are featured as downloadable content in Rock Band, with "Am I Crazy" being a free track, and the other two being sold for half the normal price.

Track listing
All songs written and composed by Little Fish, except where noted.

Personnel
 Julia "Juju" Sophie – vocals, lead guitar
 Neil "Nez" Greenaway – drums
 Paul Ill – Bass on tracks 1, 3, 4, 5, 8, 9, 10, and 11
 Linda Perry – Bass on tracks 2, 6, and 12. Hammond B3 on tracks 1, 4, 5, 7, 8, 9, and 12. Wurlitzer on tracks 8 and 9. Lap steel guitar on tracks 5, 7, and 12.
 Thomas Aiezza – Background vocals on track 1.
 Richard Butchins – Background vocals on track 11.
 Ed Richardson – A&R Management Universal Motown

References

Baffled and Beat - Little Fish. Amazon.co.uk.

External links

2010 debut albums
Little Fish (band) albums
Custard Records albums
Albums produced by Linda Perry